Serra de d'Esparreguera or Serra Esparreguera (although the spellings Sierra de Espaneguera or Sierra Espaneguera are common in many maps) is an over  long mountain range in the Alt Maestrat comarca, Valencian Community, Spain.

Geography
This mountain chain rises abruptly from a plain and looks quite impressive from certain angles. It extends in a roughly SW-NE direction between Atzeneta del Maestrat and Albocàsser. Its highest point is 1087 m high Esparreguera; another important summit is Morral Blanc (1060 m). These mountains are frequently covered in snow in the winter.

See also
Culla
Mountains of the Valencian Community

References

External links
El País Valencià poble a poble; comarca a comarca - Alt Maestrat
La Torre d'En Besora tourism

Esparreguera
Esparreguera
Alt Maestrat